Lieutenant-General Willem Petrus Louw  (Bloemhof, 24 November 1920 – 4 July 1980) was a South African military commander.  He joined the South African Army in the Special Service Battalion in 1938, and served in Italy in World War II.

Military career 
After enlisting as a private, he served as an NCO in the Technical Service Corps (SAOC) and was seconded to the South African Infantry. In 1943 he attended a Candidate Officers' course and was appointed a 2nd Lieutenant in the South African Army Armoured Corps. He was transferred to the 6th Armoured Division and deployed to the Middle East and Italy.

After the war, he served in various posts and in 1959 became Officer Commanding North West Cape Command In 1960 he attended a Parachute Instructors' course in England. He was promoted to Commandant (Lieutenant Colonel) in January 1961 and in April 1961 became the founder and first commanding officer of 1 Parachute Battalion. He was promoted to Colonel in 1964 and appointed OC of the Military College in Voortrekkerhoogte. In 1966 he served as OC Northern Transvaal Command as a Brigadier and Chief of the Army from 1967 to 1973, and as Inspector-General of the South African Defence Force from 1973 to 1975.

After a re-organisation of the SADF, the position of Inspector General was abolished and he retired on 31 March 1975.

Awards and decorations

References

See also
List of South African military chiefs
South African Army

1920 births
1980 deaths
Afrikaner people
South African people of Dutch descent
South African military personnel of World War II
Chiefs of the South African Army
People from Bloemhof